Edgardo Rivera García (born January 3, 1955) is an Associate Justice of the Supreme Court of Puerto Rico. He was nominated by Governor Luis Fortuño to succeed retired Justice Efraín Rivera Pérez. Nominated on August 3, 2010, he was confirmed by the Senate of Puerto Rico on September 8, 2010.

Early life

Born on January 3, 1955, in San Juan, Puerto Rico, Rivera García studied at the Liceo Interamericano Castro before obtaining his B.A. at the University of Puerto Rico, Río Piedras Campus, in 1977. At the same university, he obtained a Masters in Public Administration in 1983 and a Juris Doctor in 1988. He is single and the father of three daughters.

Public service

He was appointed by Governor Pedro Rosselló as a district attorney in 1994, resigning in 1997 to become then-Senate President Charlie Rodriguez's Director of Legislative Affairs until 2000. That year, Rosselló nominated him to be a Superior Court Judge, a post he held until Fortuño appointed him to the Court of Appeals in 2009.

See also 
List of Hispanic/Latino American jurists

References

1955 births
Living people
Associate Justices of the Supreme Court of Puerto Rico
Hispanic and Latino American judges
Puerto Rican judges
21st-century American judges